Pierre Bangoura (1938 – 7 August 2016) was a Guinean footballer. He competed in the men's tournament at the 1968 Summer Olympics.

References

1938 births
2016 deaths
Guinean footballers
Guinea international footballers
Olympic footballers of Guinea
Footballers at the 1968 Summer Olympics
Sportspeople from Conakry
Association football defenders